

Winners and nominees

1980s

1990s

2000s

2010s

2020s

Records  
 Most awarded comedy program: Cachún cachún ra ra!, 4 times.
 Most nominated comedy program: Vecinos with 6 nominations.
 Most nominated comedy program without a win: 40 y 20 with 3 nominations.
 Comedy program winning after short time: Cachún cachún ra ra! (1983, 1984 and 1985), 3 consecutive years.
 Comedy program winning after long time: La familia P. Luche (2004 and 2008), 4 years difference.

References

External links 
TVyNovelas at esmas.com
TVyNovelas Awards at the univision.com

Comedy Program
Comedy Program
Comedy Program